is a town located in Shiki District, Nara Prefecture, Japan.

As of April 1, 2017, the town has an estimated population of 8,704. The total area is 5.94 km².

Geography
The Yamato River flows through the town, and branches off into three rivers, the Asuka River, the Tera River, and the Soga River. The majority of the town is flat.

Transportation

Rail
Kintetsu Railway
 Kashihara Line Yūzaki Station

Notable places
 Fukiji (Buddhist Temple)
 Shimanoyama Kofun
 Omozuka

References

External links

 Kawanishi official website 

Towns in Nara Prefecture